Manganese(II) fluoride is the chemical compound composed of manganese and fluoride with the formula MnF2. It is a light pink solid, the light pink color being characteristic for manganese(II) compounds. It is made by treating manganese and diverse compounds of manganese(II) in hydrofluoric acid.  Like some other metal difluorides, MnF2 crystallizes in the rutile structure, which features octahedral Mn centers.

Uses
MnF2 is used in the manufacture of special kinds of glass and lasers.
It is a canonical example of uniaxial antiferromagnet (with Neel temperature of 68 K) which has been experimentally studied since early on.

References

Manganese(II) compounds
Fluorides
Metal halides